Baron Forteviot, of Dupplin in the County of Perth, is a title in the Peerage of the United Kingdom. It was created 4 January 1917 for the Scottish businessman and Liberal Member of Parliament, Sir John Dewar, 1st Baronet. He was Chairman of the Scotch Whisky distilling company John Dewar and Sons and also represented Inverness-shire in the House of Commons. Dewar had already been created a baronet, of the City of Perth, on 24 July 1907. Since 1993, the titles have been held by his grandson, the fourth Baron.

The name Forteviot comes from the historic village, the last Pictish capital of Scotland. Kenneth MacAlpin, King of the Scots, died at Forteviot in 859.

Barons Forteviot (1917)
John Alexander Dewar, 1st Baron Forteviot (1856–1929)
John Dewar, 2nd Baron Forteviot FRSE (1885–1947)
Henry Evelyn Alexander Dewar, 3rd Baron Forteviot (1906–1993)
John James Evelyn Dewar, 4th Baron Forteviot (born 1938)

The heir apparent is the present holder's son the Hon. Alexander Dewar (born 1971).

References

Baronies in the Peerage of the United Kingdom
Noble titles created in 1917
Noble titles created for UK MPs